is a Japanese light novel series by Makoto Sanda, with illustrations by Pako. It is in the midst of serialization in The Sneaker magazine published by Kadokawa Shoten. An anime television series adaptation animated by Zexcs was broadcast in Japan between October 7, 2007, and March 23, 2008, airing a total of twenty-four episodes.

Plot
The plot centers on the magician-dispatch service and Mage's Society: Astral. The main protagonist of the story is Astral's second president: Itsuki Iba, who, although he is young and inexperienced, ironically is not even a mage. Central to the story are Astral's many adventures with magical spirits and creatures, competing with rival company Goetia, rogue members, taboos and the Dark Magician's Society: Ophion, all while trying to complete enough jobs to pay the bills and fill The Association's quota and evade abolition. Each story arc is written as an incident in which the Astral members and their associates are involved.

Characters

Astral

, Fuyuka Ōura (young Itsuki)
Itsuki is Astral's kind and well-meaning second president, who inherited the title after his father, first president Tsukasa Iba mysteriously disappeared. Itsuki possesses Glam Sight (妖精眼, fairy eye) in his right eye which, when used, allows him to see magic and its weaknesses, control the flow of spell-waves and even peer into the memories of magic users who do battle against it. Itsuki's Glam Sight is extremely painful for him to use. Given his lack of formal training in its use, it is extremely dangerous to his well-being. Frequently, Itsuki's use of Glam Sight results in him receiving spell-wave contamination, the magical equivalence of radiation poisoning. When Itsuki uses his Glam Sight, then his personality becomes more dominant, and his confidence is boosted. However, when the Glam Sight is sealed by the eye-patch, then he reverts to his original tender personality.
Itsuki's Glam Sight differs from normal Glam Sight, as its power is substantially amplified, and a mysterious voice can be heard during magical incidents warning Itsuki of danger and providing analysis that Itsuki himself is unable of providing. Itsuki's Glam Sight was changed when, as children, he and Honami ventured into a Haunted house, whereupon they encountered an infant Dragon and Itsuki's exposure to the Dragon's true form resulted in the tainting of his Glam Sight. His memories of the event were subsequently sealed away as a result of the pass, or magical connection, between himself and the infant Dragon. There is a barrier that first-generation Astral members Judaix, Hazel, Sekiren, Kashiwara and Nekoyashiki erected to seal the Dragon away. Since The Dragon Incident arc, his memories of the event have returned a little. Itsuki is also learning Gogyouken from Sekiren, but otherwise has no talent for magic.

Honami is an Astral employee and Celtic magic and Witchcraft expert; unofficially, Itsuki's secretary and tutor in all things magic-related. Honami is the granddaughter of one of Astral's founders, Hazel Ambler, and is a childhood friend of Itsuki. She was present when Itsuki's Glam Sight was tainted and feels a deep sense of guilt over the incident. With her prodigious talent, the assistance of Fin Cruder, and a strong desire to master her art, she managed to revive the lost art of the Druids in two years. She competed for top seat of the "School" in England, with another child prodigy, Goetia's current Master, Adilisia Lenn Mathers. Honami speaks in Kansai dialect.
Honami has a crush on Itsuki and is the first one to hit him when any other girl pays even the slightest romantic attention to him. Honami is somewhat technophobic and is known to leave her room in quite a messy state. She does fortune-telling and writes a magazine column as side jobs.
Details are unknown but she calls the sentient wand (Living Wand) that she put in a suitcase "ojichan".
As noted in episode 11, the strength of Honami's powers depends on the moon. A full moon gives her great strength, while a crescent moon gives her little strength.

Mikan is a contract employee for Astral and Shinto specialist. She was part of the Katsuragi, an old and world-renowned family of Shinto practitioners, but came to Astral after she ran away from home. She is the youngest of Astral's members and refers to the others as family, despite their lack of blood relation. Mikan's side jobs include writing charms and conducting ceremonies.
Mikan left the Katsuragi household in order to prove that she was not merely her older sister, Kaori Katsuragi's, substitute; this feeling and her relationship with the Katsuragi family was resolved in the Oni Incident. Mikan is in her third year of Primary School.

Executive director and Onmyoudou expert of Astral. As his name suggests, Nekoyashiki is an Onmyouji that like cats and he is the only member of Astral referred to in a formal tone. He uses four cat Shikigami, or Shikineko, Seiryu (Azure Dragon of the East, 青龍), Byakko (White Tiger of the West, 白虎), Suzaku (Vermillion Bird of the South, 朱雀) and Genbu (Black Tortoise of the North, 玄武) (named after the Four Symbols) to perform his magic, but they are not required for him to do battle. Nekoyashiki, the youngest member of the first generation of Astral is the only member to remain full-time. Nekoyashiki writes for a magazine as his side job. When he was young he was a part of a number of organizations, including a large family of Onmyoudou practitioners that he was to inherit. He at one stage founded his own organization, naming it after himself, (Nekoyashiki meaning "cat mansion"). Nekoyashiki was in the business of laying curses before he was scouted by Sekiren. Nekoyashiki is approximately thirty years old.

Kuroha is Astral's latest apprentice and its only ghost member. Kuroha remembers nothing of her existence before her death except her name. Kuroha is able to change her outward appearance at will but comically, starting from episode 16, spends most of her time in a maid outfit. Itsuki met and recruited Kuroha while Astral was dispelling a spell-wave contamination arising from a taboo, saving her from being consumed by a Soul-Eater. Later on in the novel, she falls in love with Itsuki.

New member and rune magic expert. Approximately 14–15 years old. Formally a member of the Northern Europe company Mimir but joined Astral by force when his older brother contracted his services to Astral. Ortwin resents Astral and voices specific discontent towards Astral's second president, often doing so by using detestable words scolding in German. A junior from the "School" Honami and Adilisia attended. After joining Astral Ortwin set to improving management of the company. After the Vampire Incident he accepted Itsuki and in doing so, his position with Astral.

Contract employee for Astral and expert in Buddhism. Usually seen in komuso attire, has been practising Vajrayana since he was quite young. Additionally he is a genius martial artist and a master of hidden weapons. Skillfully uses Mudra and Shingon(Mantra), his abilities exceed that of Honami or Nekoyashiki and since the Larva incident has been training Itsuki in Martial Arts. Has an old-fashioned way of thinking even trying to perform seppuku as a form of apology. Contrasting his abilities in battle magic, Sekiren possesses a peace-loving personality and is romantically interested in Goetia's Daphne. Sekiren is The chief priest of Ryuuren Temple but is known to be something of a wanderer. Sekiren is the member of Astral most familiar with the Dark Magician's Society: Ophion, Sekiren finds those who would choose taboos to be repulsive, a belief he shares with Nekoyashiki.
One of the three people responsible for making Itsuki's eye patch. On the request of The Association he is on investigation in Italy.

One of the founding members of Astral. An expert in magical objects and Astral board member, currently touring Europe. Highly skilled in rune magic and witchcraft, a dubbed the "Witch of witches". Hazel is Honami's grandmother and the one who explained Itsuki's Glam Sight to Honami. One of the three people responsible for making Itsuki's eye patch.

Ex Astral employees

Astral's legendary founder and its First President. The last of the Fairy Doctors, he is referred to as "the magician that does not use magic". Itsuki's father who went missing seven years ago before Itsuki became a president. Tsukasa likes to make fun of others. Astral's first president also fought with the Dark Magician's Society; Ophion, over the dragon that resides in Furube City. Tsukasa does not have any magical talent but has Gogyouken skill as a normal martial arts.

Another of Astral's founders and former board member: Judaix, an alchemist of prodigious talent. One of the three people responsible for making Itsuki's eye patch and the first of Astral's original members to respond to the initial Dragon incident that left Itsuki's Glam Sight changed.
Judaix is a mechanical doll (Automaton) that was repaired by Tsukasa Iba. After Tsukasa disappeared, he left Astral in order to pursue his investigation of Tsukasa's disappearance and also to advance his research. During the Alchemist Incident Tholoide engages in a Fehde, a magical duel, with Itsuki and the current Astral in order to obtain Tsukasa Iba's grimoire. After that, he left for Egypt with his familiar, Lapis. His leaving Astral is under examination by The Association. He later reappears again in London during the Ophion incident.

Magic Society Goetia

Hereditary leader of the prestigious Magician's Society Goetia and descendant of King Solomon. Adelicia practices the Magic of Solomon and is able to summon and command demons of the Ars Goetia. Adelicia's personality is reflected in the demons that she summons, most of them being strong attack types. Adelicia is a contemporary and arch-rival of Honami, the two competed for the top seat at the "Academy" in England, but she left to accede Goetia's leadership on the demise of her father, Oswald lenn Mathers. Adelicia is the youngest leader in the history of Goetia, as such this has caused friction with The Association.
Adelicia is also in love with Astral's Second President, and like Honami is the first one to criticise Itsuki for his inability. Notably, Adelicia has no culinary skill.
With the help of Astral, Adelicia was able to suppress evidence of the Taboo committed by Goetia's previous leadership. During the Alchemist incident, she became a major shareholder, acquiring Judaix's 20% of the Astral's operations. After the Alchemist incident, she frequently fights alongside the employees of Astral.
The Mathers family most likely takes its name from Samuel Liddell MacGregor Mathers who translated several 'magical' texts (including The Key of Solomon) into English.

She is a loyal apprentice of Goetia, responsible for the maintenance of Goetia's residence in Furube City. Adelicia refers to her as the chief maid but Daphne prefers the title of steward. Later becomes Goetia's second in command. Daphne is proficient in both the Magic of Solomon and Rune Magic.
Daphne is actually Adelicia's older sister (from a different mother). Daphne had been in the Mathers residence since she was young. Daphne had the same blonde hair and green eyes as Adelicia, but finding it too similar, she used the colouring as a sacrifice to the Demons of Solomon. Daphne chose ivory hair and slate-coloured eyes so that she could continue to serve Goetia as Adelicia's protector while maintaining her identity as Adelicia's sister a secret. Daphne became romantically involved with Sekiren, while the two were investigating a magician that committed a taboo.

He is the former leader of Goetia, also Adelicia and Daphne's father. Oswald is hailed as the second coming of King Solomon, having accomplished the feat of summoning and commanding all seventy-two demons of the Ars Goetia. Feeling the limit of his magical study and with the provocation of the Dark Magician's society, Ophion, then Oswald surmised a magical theory that would allow a mage to consume a demon that they had summoned, breaking the taboo that forbids mages from becoming magic. Oswald himself attempted to become one with the Magic of Solomon but due to Gara's interference failed to consume all seventy-two Demons and as a result became corrupted by the taboo. Oswald was defeated by Itsuki's Glam Sight, which identified Oswald as true magic.

A Latin youth with shoulder length bright red hair. Former Apprentice and Secretary of Goetia. An excellent Mage who can perform spells that normally need several people. Gara is a member of the Dark Mage's Society, Ophion and was the impetus behind Oswald's committing a Taboo. Gara himself committed the same taboo by using the formula derived by Oswald and consuming the Demon Flauros. Gara's betrayal of Goetia was exposed by Daphne and Sekiren who subsequently defeated him and expelled him from Goetia.

Association

Kagezaki is The Association's representative in charge of Astral and a prodigious Taoist magician. His appearance is rather ordinary. Kagezaki's responsibilities within the Association include the investigation of Taboos and the punishment of mages that commit them, earning him the nickname of the "Magician that punishes Magicians". Kagezaki's powers cannot be seen by Itsuki's Glam Sight, additionally Honami and Adilisia sensed terror when opposing him. Kuroha, however, is able to approach Kagezaki without fear. Kagezaki is portrayed as being cruel and uncaring. For example, Kagezaki was in possession with enough information to prevent the Summer Festival Incident. However, he chose to make his presence known only after the beginning of the ceremony, as he did during the original incident that left Moroha Minogi incapacitated for ten years, in order to fill a quota with the Association.
Kagezaki is undoubtedly a powerful mage, as seen during the Ophion incident where his power was seen as overwhelming, exceeding the common knowledge of Magic. Nekoyashiki is the only opponent to defeat Kagezaki in a one-on-one magic battle. In Astral's founding days he was invited to join by Tsukasa, at that time he is known as Daisuke Kashiwara (柏原 代介, his assumed name). He uses doujutsu(道術).

Another Magician of the Association, Fin was sent to investigate a possible Taboo connected to Itsuki being hidden by Astral. A Changeling who sports a shock of a blonde hair and blue eyes, also a Celtic Magician. Fin met Honami during her Celtic magic field training and they restored the dying Celtic magic. Fin was much like a teacher to Honami.
He is also a member of the Dark Mage's Ophion and, like Itsuki, possesses the Glam Sight in his eyes, a gift bestowed upon him after returning from the land of Fairies. As a changeling his Glam Sight is geared towards knowing the desires of others that he may aid in their fulfillment. In the Dragon Incident, in order to fulfill Honami's wish he unsealed the Dragon to which Itsuki is connected to in order to use it as a sacrifice in a ceremony that would remove the taint from Itsuki's Glam Sight eye. Fin's actions during the Dragon Incident were eventually thwarted by Astral, and Fin fled Furube before The Association could arrive. Fin is next seen searching for Honami's grandmother, Hazel Ambler, in Venezia, where he encountered Sekiren and a magic duel ensues.

He is Vice Representative of the Association. Darius is a high-level mage, able to summon Angels. In fact, Darius is actually Honami's father, having renounced the Ambler name. He has broken all ties with Honami and her grandmother, and because of that, little else is known about him.

Katsuragi family

Suzuka is the current head of the Katsuragi family, a magic society of shinto practitioners. Also the grandmother of Mikan and Kaori. She refused to let Mikan return to Astral when Nekoyashiki brought Mikan back home. Though not being able to acknowledge this matter, Astral still picked up Katsuragis' request of the Katsuragi festival regarding the "oni extermination".

Kikyō is Suzuka's daughter and mother of Kaori and Mikan. She died 3 years ago during the Katsuragi festival.

Mikan's sister. Although a young girl of approximately ten years old, she speaks in a very old-fashioned phrasing.

Born in Kobe, he practices a Kagura fighting style. One of the guardians of the direct descent of the head of the Katsuragi family. In the beginning, he was Kaori's guardian, but an incident that happened 3 years ago ended his guardian duty, and he left. He is called back when Mikan returns home.

Yuzuru is a slender youth who dresses in a white costume similar to that of a Kannushi. Besides Meigen, he also guards Kaori. He was Mikan's guardian, but due to the incident 3 years ago, he became Kaori's guardian.

Others (magic related)

He is a mustached English gentleman who wears a bowler hat. He is the teacher of Honami and Adilisia when they are students of the "School". He specializes in Egyptian magic, and he likes to conduct experiments in the "School's" laboratory.

She is a young girl with crimson hair, fair skin, blue eyes and Eastern European looks. From the exterior she looks approximately 12 years old. Her emotions seem to be limited. She attaches "ani-sama" to the mention of Judaix. Her true identity is a homonculus familiar made by Judaix Tholoide. She has the Evil Eye ability, to capture the sight of the things to see.

Diana is the leader and president of the magic items provision corporation Trismegistus. She is a beauty who often dresses in black. Has been supplying Astral with magical items for several generations. She filed a request to Astral during the flower-thief incident.

Kei is introduced to Astral by the Association, a magic user who requests the star festival. Kei is a youth with shoulder-length black hair wearing a rocket pendant. Also an Onmyouji like Nekoyashiki. Has a sister called Sakuya Isurugi.
Three years ago, he lost his sister due to an accident in the star festival. Flowing with complicated thoughts, he posted the request to Astral as an excuse to duel with Nekoyashiki, who is the remote cause of the failure that happened three years ago. Besides Onmyoudou, he uses Itsunahou also. After the ogre festival incident, he handed information of the conduct of Itsuki and the others to a person from the Association.

Kei Isurugi's sister who is always smiling and has shoulder-length black hair. Nekoyashiki, who was to become successor to the sect which the Isurugi family is in, left. Sakuya then executed the star festival in the place of Nekoyashiki, but it failed for certain reasons.

Shinogi is the Kannushi of a shrine. During the shrine's summer festival, she requested a rental from Astral. Her brother is Moroha Minagi.
After the summer-festival incident, she continued to train under her brother, Moroha. After that, the vessel spirit offering is filed to Astral as a request.

Moroha is the elder brother of shrine successor Shinogi. Due to the failed ritual during the last summer festival, he fell into a sleeping state for ten years. After the summer festival incident, he overlooks his sister's training.

A vampire and rune magic user.
Cecilie is a member of "Ophion", holding the position of "Kingdom (Malkuth)".
"Foundation (Yesod)"
The masked alchemist that holds the position of "Foundation (Yesod)" in "Ophion".

The necromancer holding the position of "Persistence (Netzach)" in "Ophion"

Others

A daughter of Itsuki's caretaker, Itsuki was under the care of Yuuka's parents when he was young. Yuuka treats Itsuki as her "big brother" and thinks of herself as his "little sister". Itsuki refers to her as a "sworn sibling". Yuuka and her parents know about Itsuki's Glam Sight. Currently because of her father's work, Yuuka and her family are in America. Even so, she plans to make overseas calls to Itsuki frequently.

Itsuki's close childhood friend since primary school (self-proclaimed). Despite having a different family name, he is really the brother of Chidori Tomakomai. 8 years ago, by chance, Itsuki and Chidori got involved in a magic-contamination incident.

A friend of Itsuki and Honami, the well-liked class president. When her grandfather went missing, she found an Astral name card in his belongings and went to Astral for help. Because of that, she more or less understand the circumstances of her classmates, Itsuki, Honami and Adilisa.

The teacher in charge of the sick bay in the school which Itsuki attends. A woman who speaks in a shattered manner, always seen with cigarette and chocolate. Though having a different family name, she is really the older sister of Kazushi Yamada. For some reason, after the magic-contamination incident that happened eight years ago, she has been watching over Itsuki.

Explanation of magic

Celtic Magic
The magic used by a Druid – a priest of ancient Celtic society. It draws upon natural magic energy involving the power of the forest and rocks, with the use of sacred song, cyclobalanopsis, mistletoe, and a stone circle. This magic is passed down only by oral instruction. Additionally, the user must memorize numerous sacred songs and also have extensive magic knowledge. Honami revived this forgotten magic in two years, with the help of Fin Cruda. However, Honami's celtic magic is slightly different because she dislikes the original method. Original celtic magic uses sacrifices as a power source, while Honami uses witchcraft to draw upon the moon and the cone of power instead.
Celtic Magic Battle Chants

King Solomon's Magic
There are two types: summoning magic conducting and evoking seventy-two demons, and amulet magic using seven planets' power which affect the seventy-two demons. Summoning magic uses a pot which seals demons within magic circles, triangles, pentagrams, hexagrams, and others. By conducting to high-rank demons, like Baal, Astaroth, Paimon, and Asmodai, the user can summon the lower-ranking demon than the demon they conduct. It is extremely difficult magic. Even if the users have first-class magic talent, they can usually summon only one kind of demon in their entire lives with the exception of the Mathers family. Only King Solomon and Oswald lenn Mathers succeeded in summoning all seventy-two demons. Adilisia has summoned about 20 kinds of demons. If the user makes a slight mistake while summoning, the demons will revolt against their master, possibly maiming or killing them.
Shinto
The magic which purifies all defilement with tamagushi, norito and kagura. It creates a very strong barrier. Moreover, it can enshrine and comfort gods and spirits. In the shinto territory, like the shrine, other magics become weakened, but shinto is weakened conversely outside Japan.
Onmyōdō
A synthetic magic which fused Yin and yang, Wu Xing, Feng shui, Vajrayana, Jyugondou, Folk religion and others. This magic user is good at controlling spell power accurately (for example, using many shikigami at the same time).
Alchemy
It is described similarly to common Alchemy.
Vajrayana
Buddhism magic which mixed with some other magic method. The user borrows the powers of Bodhisattva, Wisdom King and Deva by using mudra and mantra. Besides the user is good at direct physical attack with Buddhist prayer beads, khakkhara (shakujou), or a club.
Rune magic
It is described similarly to common Rune magic.

Media

Light novels

Manga

Rental Magica

Rental Magica from SOLOMON

Anime

The anime series is shown out of chronological order, meaning that episode one chronologically occurs later in the series. This is quite similar to how The Melancholy of Haruhi Suzumiya was shown, although it is not stated as such in next episode previews. The anime uses four pieces of theme music; two opening themes and two ending themes.

References

External links
Official Right Stuf website
Official website (Archived)  

2004 Japanese novels
Anime and manga based on light novels
Kadokawa Sneaker Bunko
Kadokawa Dwango franchises
Shōnen manga
Zexcs
Light novels